Andrew Kwan (born 16 December 1962) is a diver from Hong Kong. He competed in the men's springboard and men's platform events at the 1984 Summer Olympics.

References

1962 births
Living people
Hong Kong male divers
Divers at the 1984 Summer Olympics
Place of birth missing (living people)
Olympic divers of Hong Kong